Pākehā Māori were early European settlers (known as Pākehā in the Māori language) who lived among the Māori in New Zealand.

History
Many Pākehā Māori were runaway seamen or escaped Australian convicts who settled in Māori communities by choice. They often found a welcome, took wives and were treated as Māori, particularly in the first two decades of the 19th century. The rarity of Europeans in New Zealand and the importance of trade in European goods (particularly muskets) made Pākehā Māori highly prized for their trading skills. Some achieved a degree of prestige among the Māori and fought in battle with their adopted iwi (tribes) in the New Zealand Wars of 1843 to 1872, sometimes against European soldiers. While some lived the rest of their lives amongst Māori, others, such as the lapsed missionary Thomas Kendall, did so only briefly.

A few Pākehā Māori such as James Caddell, John Rutherford and Barnet Burns even received moko (facial tattoos).

As more Europeans arrived, the status of early Europeans among Māori fell, and some of the early Pākehā Māori reverted to a more European existence.

In 1862 and 1863, the early settler Frederick Edward Maning published two books under the pseudonym "A Pakeha Maori" in which he describes how they lived.

Notable Pākehā Māori
 Kimball Bent
 Barnet Burns
 James Caddell
 Thomas Kendall
 David MacNish
 Frederick Edward Maning
 Jacky Marmon
 John Rutherford

See also
 Māori Indians
 Caramuru
 John Young
 Isaac Davis
 Jim Bridger
 Gonzalo Guerrero
 Charlotte Badger
 Manuel José (trader)

Notes

References
Pakeha Maori: The extraordinary story of the Europeans who lived as Maori in early New Zealand by Trevor Bentley; published 1999 
Old New Zealand: being Incidents of Native Customs and Character in the Old Times by 'A Pakeha Maori' (Frederick Edward Maning) Gutenberg ebook, originally published 1863

 
Māori history
Settlers of New Zealand